CTG may refer to:

Organizations
 Central Economic Society for the Grand Duchy of Poznań, a social-economic organization of Polish landowners
 Counter Terrorism Group, a European intelligence sharing forum
 CTG Collective, an organization focusing on exploring the human experience through art
 Center for Technology in Government, a research institution in University at Albany, State University of New York, US
 Commerce & Trade Group, a branch of the Central Superior Services of Pakistan

Companies
 Cambridge Technology Group, a technical consulting company, with divisions such as Open Environment Corporation
 Channel Technologies Group, a California-based company that produces piezoelectric materials, transducers, turnkey integrated systems and optical technologies, U.S.
 Channel Tunnel Group, the British half of the consortium that advised on financing and secured loan commitments for the building of the Channel Tunnel between England and France
 China Three Gorges Corporation, a state-owned power company, established in 1993
 Computer Task Group, Incorporated, an information technology staffing company headquartered in Buffalo, New York, US
 The Counterterrorism Group, Inc., a subsidiary of the global intelligence, risk consulting, and security firm Paladin 7
 Vietinbank (Ho Chi Minh City Stock Exchange: CTG), a state-owned Vietnamese bank

Science and technology
 Cardiotocography, a technical means of recording the fetal heartbeat and the uterine contractions during pregnancy
 CTG, a DNA triplet encoding the amino acid leucine in the common genetic code
 Cotangent (ctg), a function
 Color TV-Game models

Transportation
 Rafael Núñez International Airport (IATA airport code), Cartagena, Colombia
 Canadian Coast Guard (ICAO airline designator)

Other uses
 Close the Gap, a social justice campaign in Australia
 Chittagong, a coastal seaport city that is the second largest in Bangladesh
 Commander of the Task Group, designation of various task forces in the United States Tenth Fleet
 Chittagonian language (ISO 639-3 code)